Goldsea is a large, fully featured magazine site. The magazine was started in 1998. It is aimed at Asian Americans and publishes interviews and profiles of successful Asian Americans. The "Goldsea 100" celebrates high-achieving Asian American businesspeople and includes several billionaires, including one aged only 32. In 2006, Ford launched an advertising campaign of the site along with one other website and Asian television advertisements as part of an advertising campaign targeted at Korea, China, and Vietnam.

Goldsea.com has sometimes been cited by Asian news sources.

References

External links
 Goldsea homepage

Asian-American magazines
Online magazines published in the United States
Ethnic mass media in the United States
Magazines established in 1998